Habenaria quinqueseta, the longhorn bog orchid, is a species of  orchid closely related to H. macroceratitis and often mistaken for it.

Habenaria quinqueseta is native to Central America, the West Indies (Cuba, the Bahamas, Hispaniola, Jamaica), southern Mexico (Oaxaca, Veracruz, Chiapas), northern South America (Colombia, Venezuela, the Guianas), and the southeastern United States (from Texas to South Carolina).

References

External links

quinqueseta
Orchids of the Caribbean
Orchids of Central America
Orchids of Belize
Orchids of Cuba
Orchids of Mexico
Orchids of the United States
Orchids of South America
Plants described in 1803
Terrestrial orchids
Flora without expected TNC conservation status